David Coote may refer to:

 David Coote (cricketer) (born 1955), former English cricketer
 David Coote (referee), English football referee